0G (pronounced "Zero-G") is the seventh and final studio album by J-pop duo Two-Mix, released by WEA Japan on October 11, 2001. It includes the single "Gravity Zero".

The album peaked at No. 24 on Oricon's weekly albums chart.

Track listing 
All lyrics are written by Shiina Nagano; all music is composed by Minami Takayama; all music is arranged by Two-Mix.

Charts

References

External links 
 
 
 

2001 albums
Two-Mix albums
Japanese-language albums
Warner Music Japan albums